Beverly may refer to:
Beverly, King and Queen County, Virginia
Beverly, Northampton County, Virginia
Beverly, West Virginia, once part of Virginia